Alice Notley (born November 8, 1945) is an American poet. Notley came to prominence as a member of the second generation of the New York School of poetry—although she has always denied being involved with the New York School or any specific movement in general. Notley's early work laid both formal and theoretical groundwork for several generations of poets; she is considered a pioneering voice on topics like motherhood and domestic life.

Notley's experimentation with poetic form, seen in her books 165 Meeting House Lane, When I Was Alive, The Descent of Alette, and Culture of One, ranges from a blurred line between genres, to a quotation-mark driven interpretation of the variable foot, to a full reinvention of the purpose and potential of strict rhythm and meter.  She also experimented with channeling spirits of deceased loved ones, primarily men gone from her life like her father and her husband, poet Ted Berrigan, and used these conversations as topics and form on her poetry. Her poems have also been compared to Gertrude Stein, as well as her contemporary Bernadette Mayer. Mayer and Notley both used their experience as mothers and wives in their work.

In addition to poetry, Notley has written a book of criticism (Coming After, University of Michigan, 2005), a play ("Anne's White Glove"—performed at the Eye & Ear Theater in 1985), a biography (Tell Me Again, Am Here, 1982), and she has edited three publications, Chicago, Scarlet, and Gare du Nord, the latter two co-edited with Douglas Oliver. Notley's collage art appeared in Rudy Burckhardt's film "Wayward Glimpses" and her illustrations have appeared on the cover of numerous books, including a few of her own. As is often written in her biographical notes, "she has never tried to be anything other than a poet," and with over forty books and chapbooks and several major awards, she is one of the most prolific and lauded American poets today. She is a recipient of the Ruth Lilly Poetry Prize.

Early life
Notley was born on November 8, 1945 in Bisbee, Arizona and grew up in Needles, California.  Notley wrote extensively of her childhood and early life in her book Tell Me Again (Am here, 1982).

Notley left Needles for New York City to attend Barnard College in 1963, desiring an escape from the isolation of her hometown.  She received a Bachelor of Arts from Barnard College in spring 1967 and left New York City that fall for the fiction program at the Iowa Writers' Workshop. She was the only woman in her genre and one of two in the entire graduate writing department.  Notley cites—in part—a reading by Robert Creeley as early inspiration for her writing more poetry.  A close relationship with the poet Anselm Hollo, who was teaching at the program at that time, led to Notley leaving Iowa City for Morocco in 1968.  Notley claims it was boring and returned to Iowa City where she met the poet Ted Berrigan who began as an instructor at the school that fall.

After Notley's graduation, she and Berrigan spent periods of time in New York City and Buffalo.  During the winter of 1970–71, Notley and Berrigan lived on Long Island, where Notley wrote her first book, 165 Meeting House Lane (Twenty-Four Sonnets).  The book took its title from the address of their home on Long Island and was published by Berrigan's C Press.  It bears a dedication to James Schuyler and Anne and Fairfield Porter, who were also residing together on Long Island at the time.  Notley also thanks Tom Clark who would go on to re-publish the sonnet cycle in his anthology All Stars.  Notley and Berrigan spent the several months between Long Island and Chicago in Bolinas, California, which is where Berrigan officially printed 165 Meeting House Lane.  Notley's second book, Phoebe Light, was published in 1973 by Bill Berkson's Bolinas-based press Big Sky.

1972–75: Chicago and Essex
In 1972, Notley married Berrigan and the two moved to Chicago where Berrigan had been given Ed Dorn's newly vacated teaching position at Northeastern Illinois University.  Notley and Berrigan joined an already active community of Chicago poets, including Paul Carroll, Paul Hoover, and Maxine Chernoff. Notley gave birth to their first son, Anselm Berrigan, named after Anselm Hollo, in 1972, as well.

At Berrigan's behest, his students at Northeastern became very active members of the local poetry scene, starting magazines and reading series.  One group of students—Darlene Pearlstein, Peter Kostakis, and Richard Friedman—started a small poetry press, The Yellow Press, which would go on to publish two books by Notley, one book by Berrigan, and give out a yearly Ted Berrigan Prize—overseen in part by Notley—for a first book (though the press would cease publishing two years in).  Young poets on the Chicago scene regularly hung out with Notley and Berrigan at their home and many followed the couple back to New York City in the late 70s.  The circle of younger poets who spent time with Notley and Berrigan included the aforementioned members of the Yellow Press team, Barbara Barg, Rochelle Kraut, Rose Lesniak, Bob Rosenthal, Steve Levine, Simon Schuchat, Tim Milk, and several others.

While in Chicago, Notley started publishing her magazine Chicago, a legal-sized mimeograph publication which would continue through both her pregnancies and even her relocation to England.  Notley began the magazine to connect with preexisting poet friends and meet new writers on both coasts while living in the midwest.  The magazine ran for eight issues, three of which were published while Notley and Berrigan lived in England.  Notley edited seven of the issues with Berrigan taking over one while Notley was pregnant with their first son.  The artist George Schneeman, perhaps most famous for his artworks that appeared on the covers of dozens of books of poetry, did all of the covers for the magazine.

In 1974, Berrigan got a job as a visiting poet at University of Essex, so Notley and Berrigan, with their son Anselm, relocated first to London, then to Brightlingsea in Essex.  While in England, Notley would write her second sonnet cycle Great Interiors, Wines and Spirits of the World, which was originally published in a Notley-themed issue of the Chicago magazine Out There.

From February through June 1974 in Wivenhoe, Essex, Notley wrote her book Songs for the Unborn Second Baby (United Artists, 1979). While Notley had written on motherhood prior to Songs, this book was her first to focus fully on the matter and is the first full-length book of a New York School-affiliated poet to take on the task of addressing poetry's sexism and the pressures and setbacks of motherhood in both personal and creative life. It was reissued in 2021 by the London-based small press Distance No Object. Notley gave birth to her and Berrigan's second child, Edmund Berrigan, at Colchester Hospital in 1974.

The couple returned to Chicago for a brief period of time after their year in England before moving to New York City in 1976.

1976–92: New York City
1976 saw Notley and Berrigan moving their family permanently to New York City's Lower East Side, where they'd live together until Berrigan's death in 1983.  Their apartment at 101 St. Mark's Place again became a hub for both young writers and Berrigan and Notley's contemporaries.  Notley remained fairly prolific during this era, writing and publishing several full-length collections.  Perpetually strapped for cash, the two took on whatever small jobs they could to support the family.  Notley and Berrigan were frequent instructors at Naropa University's summer writing program.  Some of Notley's most famous engagements with the poetry community while in NYC were her workshops at the Poetry Project at St. Mark's Church, which were attended by dozens of young poets including Bob Holman, Patricia Spears Jones, Steve Carey, and Susie Timmons. Eileen Myles wrote of their experience in Notley's workshops in their books Chelsea Girls (Black Sparrow Press, 2004; Ecco, 2015) and Inferno (O/R Books, 2010). Of her 1983 workshop, Notley wrote:

In 1986, Notley led a workshop where participants were required to write an entire book during the course of their meetings.  After the workshop ended, Notley teamed up with students to print copies of their works on the mimeograph machine in the St. Mark's basement.  The books were published under the imprint Unimproved Editions and Notley made cover art for the majority of the titles.  Her own book, entitled Parts of a Wedding, was published first in a small edition by Unimproved Editions then later as a section of the O Books anthology O One.

Berrigan's death in 1983 struck the poetry community exceptionally hard and over the next decade, Notley would suffer the loss of many others who were close to her.  Notley's 1985 play "Anne's White Glove," a commission by Ada Katz's Eye and Ear Theater navigated the pain of Berrigan's death, and her collections Margaret & Dusty (Coffee House, 1985), Parts of a Wedding (Unimproved Editions, 1986), and At Night the States (The Yellow Press, 1987) contain material written during a period of mourning.  Notley's elegiac work during this era, including her poems "Beginning With a Stain" and "At Night the States," is some of her most widely celebrated.

1992–present: Paris

In 1992, Notley moved to Paris with her second husband, the British poet and novelist Douglas Oliver (1937–2000), whom she met while living in England in 1974.  The two worked on two magazines together, Gare du Nord and Scarlet, and self-published a compendium of their own books, The Scarlet Cabinet, which contained Notley's Descent of Alette. Descent would grow to be Notley's most widely read and taught collection after its reprinting by Penguin in 1996. Notley has remained in Paris but makes several trips to the United States each year to give readings and teach small workshops. Some have linked Notley's geographical move to Paris—since it followed a period of intensely personal writing—as also marking a creative distance between herself and her poems, though her books Mysteries of Small Houses (Penguin, 1998) and Culture of One (Penguin, 2011) engage very much with personal matter.

In 1999, Notley was both a finalist for the Pulitzer Prize and a winner of the Los Angeles Times Book Prize for Poetry. In spring 2001, she received an award from the American Academy of Arts and Letters and the Poetry Society of America's Shelley Memorial Award. This period also marked an increase in scholarly interest in Notley's work.

Notley has stayed very involved in the preservation of both Berrigan and Oliver's works, having edited and written introductions for a number of their books and she continues to be a prolific and powerful force in contemporary poetry, winning the Leonore Marshall Poetry Prize in 2007 and the Ruth Lilly Poetry Prize in 2015. Several poems from her 2007 collection In the Pines were set to music by the Canadian indie pop band AroarA for their 2014 Polaris Music Prize-nominated 2013 EP In the Pines and in Fall 2014, a conference celebrating Notley's work was held at the Bay Area Public School in Oakland, California. Over two nights, November 14 and 15, 2016, Notley read The Descent of Alette in its entirety at The Lab in San Francisco.

Timeline

1970s
 Poems & stories (thesis, unpublished) (University of Iowa, 1970)
 165 Meeting House Lane (C Press, 1971)
 Phoebe Light (Big Sky, 1973)
 Incidentals in the Day World (Angel Hair, 1973)
 For Frank O'Hara's Birthday (Reality Street, 1976)
 Alice Ordered to Be Made (The Yellow Press, 1976)
 A Diamond Necklace (Frontward Books, 1977)
 Songs for the Unborn Second Baby (United Artists, 1979; reprint Distance No Object, 2021)

1980s
 Dr. Williams' Heiresses (Tuumba, 1980)
 When I Was Alive (Vehicle Editions, 1980)
 How Spring Comes (Toothpaste Press, 1980)
 Waltzing Matilda (Kulchur Press, 1981; reprint Faux Press, 2002) 
 Tell Me Again (Am Here/Immediate Editions, 1982)
 Sorrento (Sherwood Press, 1984)
 
 Parts of a Wedding (Unimproved Editions, 1986)
 At Night the States (The Yellow Press, 1988)
 From a Work in Progress (Dia Foundation, 1988)

1990s
 Homer's Art (Institute of Further Studies, 1990)
 The Scarlet Cabinet (with Douglas Oliver) (Scarlet Editions, 1992)
 Selected Poems of Alice Notley (Talisman House, 1993)
 To Say You (Pyramid Atlantic, 1994)
 Close to Me and Closer...(The Language of Heaven) and Desamere (O Books, 1995)
 
 
 Byzantine Parables (Cambridge, 1998)

2000s
 
 Iphigenia (Belladonna, 2002)
 From the Beginning (The Owl Press, 2005)
 City of (Rain Taxi, 2005)
 
 
 
 
 Above the Leaders (Veer Books, 2008)

2010s
 
 
 
 Secret ID (The Cantenary Press, 2012)
 Negativity's Kiss (Presses universitaires de Rouen et du Havre, 2013)
 Manhattan Luck (Heart's Desire, 2014)
 
 Certain Magical Acts (Penguin Poets, 2016)
 Eurynome's Sandals (Presses universitaires de Rouen et du Havre, 2019)

2020s
 For the Ride (Penguin Poets, 2020) 
 
 Get the Money!: Collected Prose (1961-1983) (City Lights Books, 09/13/2022)  Get the Money!

References

External links
 Alice Notley Papers MSS 319. Special Collections & Archives, UC San Diego Library.
 
 Griffin Poetry Prize biography
 Griffin Poetry Prize reading, including video clip
 Interview by Douglas A. Martin at Loggernaut.
 A State of Disobedience: by Joel Brouwer, published October 14, 2007: ostensibly a review of Notley's 2007 release In The Pines, this piece is a perceptive outtake as it both encapsulates the arc of Notley's career in poetry and the trajectory of her developing poetics
 Academy of American Poets biography on poets.org
 The Electronic Poetry Center at Buffalo University's entry on Alice Notley
 Alice Notley by Robert Dewhurst Bomb

1945 births
Living people
People from Bisbee, Arizona
Modernist women writers
Barnard College alumni
New York School poets
Iowa Writers' Workshop alumni
People from Needles, California
American women poets
Modernist writers
21st-century American women